Sant'Onofrio is the Italian name of St. Onuphrius. This name may refer to:

 Sant'Onofrio (Rome), a church in Rome
 Sant'Onofrio, Calabria, a municipality in Italy
 Sant'Onofrio (Campli), a comune (frazioni) in Teramo, Abruzzo, Italy
 Hermitage of Sant'Onofrio, Serramonacesca, Abruzzo
 Sant'Onofrio (Lanciano), a frazione of Chieti
 Hermitage of Sant'Onofrio al Morrone, Sulmona, Abruzzo
 Sant'Onofrio Altarpiece by Luca Signorelli, on display in Duomo, Orvieto